The Beach Hotel can refer to:
 Beach Hotel (Sydney) in Australia
 Beach Hotel (Galveston) in Texas, USA